Aílson da Silva Feitosa (born 13 August 1988) is a Brazilian track and field athlete who competes in the sprints, specialising in the 200 metres. He is a frequent member of the Brazilian 4×100 metres relay team and won three gold medals for his country in 2011, taking titles at the South American Championships in Athletics, Military World Games and Pan American Games.

Born in Sítio Novo do Tocantins, he began competing at national level in 2005 and won a number of medals in the 100 metres and 200 metres in the youth, junior and under-23 sections of the Brazilian championships. He represents the BM&F Bovespa club. Feitosa made his first international appearances in 2007: at the South American Junior Championships he was fourth in the 200 m and led off the Brazilian team to the 4×100 metres relay silver medal. He was also part of the relay team at the 2007 Pan American Junior Athletics Championships where Brazil finished fourth. In 2008 he broke the 21-second mark for the 200 m, running a time of 20.96 seconds. The following year he improved his 100 m best to 10.32 seconds at the São Paulo regionals.

The 2011 season saw Feitosa win a series of gold medals. In June he placed sixth in the individual 200 m at the 2011 South American Championships in Athletics before going on to win the 4 × 100 m relay title for Brazil. The 2011 Military World Games were held in Rio de Janeiro a month later and he won the relay title with a team of Vicente de Lima, Basílio Morais Junior and Nilson André. He also came sixth in the 200 m final. The 2011 Pan American Games was Feitosa's third international selection for the Brazilian relay squad that year and he led off the team including Sandro Viana, Nilson André and Bruno de Barros which went on to equal the Pan American Games record time of 38.18 seconds for the event.

Personal bests
100 m: 10.30 (wind: +2.0 m/s) –  São Paulo, 5 April 2014
100 m (wind assisted): 10.19 w (wind: +2.1 m/s) –  Campinas, 4 May 2013
200 m: 20.62 (wind: +1.7 m/s) –  São Paulo, 12 May 2012
400 m: 46.79 –  São Paulo, 22 February 2014

Achievements

References

External links

Living people
1988 births
Athletes (track and field) at the 2011 Pan American Games
Brazilian male sprinters
Sportspeople from Tocantins
Pan American Games athletes for Brazil
Pan American Games gold medalists for Brazil
Pan American Games medalists in athletics (track and field)
South American Games gold medalists for Brazil
South American Games medalists in athletics
Competitors at the 2014 South American Games
Medalists at the 2011 Pan American Games
21st-century Brazilian people